Montemaggiore al Metauro is a frazione of the comune of Colli al Metauro, Marche, central Italy. It was a separate comune until 1 January 2017.

 

Cities and towns in the Marche